Dragley Beck is a hamlet in Cumbria, England. Historically part of Lancashire, it was the birthplace of Sir John Barrow (1764-1848), one of the founders of the Royal Geographical Society.

References

Hamlets in Cumbria
South Lakeland District